Nagashino may refer to:

 Nagashino castle, a Sengoku period Japanese castle located in eastern Aichi Prefecture, Japan
 Battle of Nagashino, 1575, near Nagashino Castle in Mikawa Province, Japan